Return to the Planet of the Apes is a 1975 American animated television series based on the 1968 film Planet of the Apes and its sequels, which were, in turn, based on the 1963 novel of the same name by Pierre Boulle. Unlike the film, its sequels, and the 1974 live-action television series, which involved a primitive ape civilization, Return to the Planet of the Apes depicted a technologically advanced society, complete with automobiles, film, and television; as such it more closely resembled both Boulle's original novel and early concepts for the first Apes film which were changed due to budgetary limitations in the late 1960s.

Produced following the last of the big-screen features and short-lived live-action television series, this series was among the last Planet of the Apes projects for several years following a number of comic books from Marvel Comics (August 1974 – February 1977) and a series of audio adventures from Power Records in 1974. Aside from a number of comic book series published by Malibu Comics in the early 1990s, the next project based upon Boulle's concepts would be Tim Burton's reimagining in 2001.

Along with the second Planet of the Apes film, Beneath the Planet of the Apes, this is one of only two original Planet of the Apes productions in which Roddy McDowall was not involved.

Production 
In 1975, after the failure of the live-action series, NBC and 20th Century Fox agreed to adapt Planet of the Apes for an animated series. The network contracted DePatie–Freleng Enterprises to produce a half-hour Saturday-morning cartoon titled Return to the Planet of the Apes. Doug Wildey, co-creator of Jonny Quest, took on most creative control as associate producer, storyboard director, and supervising director. Wildey had only watched the original film and Beneath, and thus based his interpretation on them. As such, the show relied less on the themes and plot developments from Escape, Conquest, and Battle and instead returned to the Vietnam War and Cold War themes prominent in the first two films.

The plot concerns three American astronauts, Bill Hudson (Tom Williams), Jeff Allen (Austin Stoker, who played MacDonald in Battle), and Judy Franklin (Claudette Nevins), who inadvertently journey to Earth's far future. They find the world populated by three groups: mute humans who inhabit desert caves, subterranean human "Underdwellers" fashioned after the mutants of Beneath, and civilized apes who subjugate the humans. Through the show, the astronauts become increasingly involved in the planet's affairs and in defending the humans against an ape invasion. The cast featured characters based on those from the previous films and TV series, including Nova (Nevins again), General Urko (Henry Cordin), Zira (Philippa Harris), Cornelius (Edwin Mills), and Dr. Zaius (Richard Blackburn). NBC broadcast thirteen episodes between September 6 and November 21, 1975. The show did not achieve particularly strong ratings. The network considered producing a second, three-episode season to complete the story, but this never materialized.

Broadcasting history 
Airing on NBC, the series premiered on September 6, 1975 and was broadcast through November 29, 1975 and continuing in reruns until September 4, 1976, although only thirteen episodes were produced. The series aired Saturday mornings at 11:00 AM Eastern/10:00 AM Central.

The series was later shown in reruns on the Sci Fi Channel in 1992 as part of Sci Fi Cartoon Quest. In Asia, the series was broadcast on STAR TV in 1994 - 1997.

Music for the series was provided by Dean Elliott, recorded in England and conducted by Eric Rogers.

Story 
As with the film and the live-action series, Return to the Planet of the Apes involved a handful of astronauts from Earth who were hurtled into the future and found themselves stuck in a world populated by advanced apes and primitive humans. Over the course of the thirteen episodes the astronauts attempted to keep one step ahead of the apes while at the same time trying to make some sense of what had happened. Additionally, they did their best to safeguard the human population from the apes.

Each episode was self-contained to an extent. The story threads did weave in and out, with characters and plots from earlier episodes popping up in later ones.  In order for the series to make any sense, the episodes need to be viewed in order.

The animated series does chronologically fit with the rest of the Apes universe. It borrows characters and elements from the movies, the TV series and the original novel. General Urko is borrowed from the TV series. Along with Zaius, Zira and Cornelius, Brent (renamed here as Ron Brent) and Nova are from the movie series. Krador and the Underdwellers in the animated series are loosely based on the mutants in Beneath the Planet of the Apes.

Unlike the movies, the animated series borrows more from the original novel. As in the apes live in a more civilized society. And they have televisions, radios, cars, aeroplanes, and boats.

As with the live action television series, the animated series was concluded before the resolution of the storyline, and we do not learn if the astronauts are able to return to their own time period. But the animated series does otherwise offer a conclusion. Doctor Zaius, in recognising the threat of a military overthrow from General Urko, assures that he is relieved of command. Further, Cornelius and Zira, in recognising that simian society was established long after human society had deteriorated, believed that the time was right for humans to be offered equal rights to that of apes and intend to present their proposition to the Senate.

Characters in the animated series frequently mention prominent apes noticeably named after human historical figures by appropriately inserting the word "ape" into their name. A notable example is "William Apespeare", an ape analog of William Shakespeare. Another scene shows a couple of ape soldiers chatting about a new movie called The Apefather, an apparent analog of The Godfather (unlike the live-action series and movies, the ape society is presented as being technologically advanced – as in the novel – rather than agrarian).

Cast and characters 
 Bill Hudson (Richard Blackburn and  Tom Williams) – One of the two male astronauts; blond, blue-eyed, depicted as wearing a blue tee-shirt and white pants.
 Cornelius (Henry Corden and Edwin Mills) – A male chimpanzee scientist/archeologist.
 Zira (Philippa Harris) – A female chimpanzee scientist who is very outspoken against the gorilla regime.
 General Urko (Henry Corden) – A sinister gorilla general who plans to drive the humans and Underdwellers off the planet.
 Judy Franklin (Claudette Nevins) – The lone female astronaut and an expert airplane pilot; she is kidnapped and held by the Underdwellers for a time before being rescued.
 Jeff Allen (Austin Stoker) – The other male astronaut; an African-American, depicted as wearing a red turtleneck shirt. Stoker previously played Mr. MacDonald in Battle for the Planet of the Apes, and is the only cast member of the live action movies to have played a part in the series.
 Dr. Zaius (Richard Blackburn) – The orangutan leader of the ape scientific community, depicted as a grandfatherly politician who questions the tactics of General Urko.
 Nova (Claudette Nevins) – A human female who joins Bill, Judy, and Jeff on their adventures.
 Ronald Brent – A U.S. astronaut who launched in the 21st century but arrived in the time of ape rule a number of years prior to the Hudson/Allen/Franklin expedition.
 Krador – The leader of the Underdwellers.
 The Underdwellers – A group of underground persons based on the mutants in the film Beneath the Planet of the Apes.

Episodes

Reception 
The series has been criticized for poor production values. Reviewers felt that the constant reuse of backgrounds and lack of movement made the action on screen dull and slow. The voicework has also been criticized for sometimes being unemotional and equally monotonous.

Despite these criticisms, the series was noted for highly detailed backgrounds, illustrations, character designs and camera effects, due in part to veteran cartoonist Doug Wildey. While animation was poor due to budget and time constraints, still artwork, which featured prominently in the program, was extremely detailed, with extensive shading, looking more like a comic book than a television cartoon.

For the most part, the scripts were intelligent, with detailed stories and solid internal continuity. Unlike many animated adaptations, Return to the Planet of the Apes managed to effectively capture the tone of the live action features, complete with the sense of alienation, wonderment and loss.

Home release 
The Return to the Planet of the Apes series was released as a part of the Ultimate DVD Collection in early 2006 by 20th Century Fox Home Entertainment. The Return to the Planet of the Apes: The Complete Animated Series release on DVD was delayed until October 3, 2006. This was the first time the series was released stand-alone on DVD. Only three of the episodes were restored in the discs included in the Ultimate DVD Collection, but all 13 were restored in the individual release. The individual release also included them in their intended order, as opposed to their airdate order as presented in the box set. The individual release also includes the option of watching the episodes with a preview of the next episode, which was not present in the box set release.

The episode list on the back of the DVD case for the individual release has many errors. The episodes are listed in airdate order as opposed to the chronological order on the actual DVDs, one episode is listed as airing the day before it actually aired and two are shown as having the same airdate, resulting in the airdates of the two subsequent episodes being one week off.

Notes and references

External links 
 
 
 : All about the 1975–76 Animated series on NBC, including extensive episode summaries from Epi-Log magazine.
 : Including Return to the Planet of the Apes.

Planet of the Apes
American children's animated science fantasy television series
American children's animated space adventure television series
1970s American animated television series
1975 American television series debuts
1976 American television series endings
Television series by DePatie–Freleng Enterprises
Television series by 20th Century Fox Television
NBC original programming
Animated television shows based on films
Post-apocalyptic animated television series
Television series based on adaptations
Television shows based on French novels
Television series set in the future
Television series set in the 4th millennium